Alexander Tuckfield (born 5 November 2004) is an Australian Paralympic swimmer. He began swimming at the age on ten. He has cerebral palsy. At the 2020 Tokyo Paralympics, he won a bronze medal

Swimming 
Tuckfield who was born on 5 November 2004 and has cerebral palsy. He began swimming at the age of ten.

At the 2020 Swimming Australia Virtual Championships, he broke the Men's 200m Freestyle S9 world record.

Tuckfield finished second in the Men's 400 m S9 at 2021 Australian Swimming Trials and qualified for the 2020 Summer Paralympics.

At the 2020 Tokyo Paralympics, Tuckfield qualified first in his heat and then won the bronze medal in the Men's 400 m freestyle S9.  His time of 4:13.54 was three-and-a-half seconds slower than the gold medal winner William Martin of Australia. He also swam in the 50 m freestyle S9 but failed to qualify for the final.

References

External links

Living people
2004 births
Male Paralympic swimmers of Australia
Swimmers at the 2020 Summer Paralympics
Medalists at the 2020 Summer Paralympics
Paralympic bronze medalists for Australia
Paralympic medalists in swimming
Australian male freestyle swimmers
S9-classified Paralympic swimmers